This is a list of railway lines made within the borders of present-day Turkey since 1860.

Railway lines

References 

Turkey